Acmispon parviflorus, synonym Lotus micranthus, is a species of legume. It is known by the common name desert deervetch. It is native to western North America from British Columbia to southern California, where it is known from many types of habitat. It is a hairy to hairless annual herb lined with leaves each made up of small oval leaflets. Solitary flowers appear in the leaf axils. Each is an ephemeral pinkish pealike bloom under a centimeter long. The fruit is a narrow, hairless, wavy-edged legume pod up to about 2.5 centimeters long.

References

External links
Jepson Manual Treatment
USDA Plants Profile
Photo gallery

parviflorus
Flora of British Columbia
Flora of California
Flora of Nevada
Flora of Oregon
Flora of Washington (state)